Ovid Butler (February 7, 1801 – July 12, 1881) was an American attorney, newspaper publisher, abolitionist, and university founder from the state of Indiana. Butler University in Indianapolis, Indiana, is named after him.

Personal life
Butler was born in Augusta, New York, on February 7, 1801. His father, Chancey Butler, moved the family west to Jennings County, Indiana, in 1817. The elder Butler became one of the first Restoration Movement or Stone-Campbell Movement preachers in Indiana. Butler studied law and practiced as an attorney in Shelbyville, Indiana, from 1825-1836. He was also an abolitionist. Butler University was dedicated to him in 1855. During this time he married Cordelia Cole. With Cordelia, Butler had three children.

In 1836, the entire family moved to Indianapolis. Soon after, Butler's wife, Cordelia, died in 1838. He then married Elizabeth A. Elgin, daughter of Thomas McOuat. Elgin and Butler had seven children together, one of which died in infancy. 

Butler died on July 12, 1881, in Indianapolis, Indiana. He is buried in the Crown Hill Cemetery. His widow Elizabeth died a year later in 1882 at the age of 63.

Career
In Indianapolis, Butler established a law firm with partners Calvin Fletcher, Simon Yandes and future Indianapolis mayor, Horatio C. Newcomb. He became interested and active in political and social issues. Butler held a firm opposition to slavery on moral and religious grounds, which was reflected in his creation of the political, abolitionist newspaper Free Soil Banner in 1849. That same year he gave up his law practice and sought early retirement due to poor health.

Butler University
As a member of the Christian Church (Disciples of Christ), Butler sought to establish a university for that Christian movement. On January 15, 1850, the Indiana General Assembly approved the university. On November 1, 1855, the North Western Christian University opened. Ovid Butler served as the head of the Board of Directors until 1871. He became Chancellor of the University and in 1877, the school became Butler University. Butler is also the namesake of the Ovid Butler Society, a recognition society for Butler University's most generous donors.

Recreation
Butler's summer months were spent at Indiana's Lake Wawasee where he had a residence in the vicinity of Vawter Park Village.

References

External links
The Restoration Movement: Ovid Butler

1801 births
1881 deaths
19th-century American lawyers
Activists from New York (state)
American abolitionists
American Disciples of Christ
Burials at Crown Hill Cemetery
Butler University faculty
Christian abolitionists
Founders of universities
Indiana Democrats
Indiana Free Soilers
Indiana lawyers
Indiana Republicans
Members of the Indiana House of Representatives
People from Augusta, New York
People from Indianapolis
People from Jennings County, Indiana